Imcheon Jo clan was one of the Korean clans. Their Bon-gwan was in Buyeo County, South Chungcheong Province. According to the research in 2015, the number of Imcheon Jo clan was 14258. Their founder was Jo Su gang. He was a 5th son of Jo Yu gil who was a grandchild of Emperor Taizu of Song in Song dynasty. He passed Imperial examination in Song dynasty and served as gong feng guan. However, he made Zhao Dezhao furious, so he was exiled to Goryeo with Jo Yu go who was his uncle. Finally, he was appointed as Prince of Garim because he made an achievement when he fought against Khitan and began Imcheon Jo clan.

See also 
 Korean clan names of foreign origin

References

External links 
 

 
Korean clan names of Chinese origin